David Faupala (born 11 February 1997) is a French footballer who plays as a forward for Beauvais.

Club career

Early life and career
Faupala was born in Bully-les-Mines, Pas-de-Calais. He joined Lens' youth setup in 2010, aged 13. After impressing within the youth sides with Lens, Faupala agreed to join Premier League side Manchester City on a three-year contract until 2018.

Manchester City
The 18-year-old immediately linked up with Manchester City Development Squad following his move and managed to score in his first friendly appearance for the club while on pre-season tour in Spain.

After experiencing a rich vein of form for the reserve side, netting four times in twelve appearances, Faupala was called up to the senior side ahead of Manchester City's FA Cup fifth round tie away to Premier League champions Chelsea. On 21 February 2016, Faupala made his senior debut in the 5–1 defeat, playing the full 90 minutes and scoring the equalising goal for City in the 37th minute.

Loan to NAC Breda
On 10 August 2016, Faupala was loaned to NAC Breda for the 2016–17 season. He made his debut on 19 August, as a 75th minute substitution for Thomas Agyepong in a 2–1 loss to Maastricht. His next appearance would come a month later on 20 September, when he would start in a KNVB Cup match, a 2–0 loss against VVV-Venlo. His scored his first goal for the club on 25 November during a 1–3 loss to SC Cambuur. The loan was ended on 2 January 2017, with Faupala having played 4 games.

Loan to Chesterfield
On 31 January 2017, Faupala was loaned to EFL League One side Chesterfield until 30 April 2017. He made his debut on 4 February, playing 90 minutes against Oldham Athletic. He scored his first goal for Chesterfield in his second match, a 3–1 loss to Northampton on 11 February. On 25 March, Faupala was shown a straight red in stoppage time for kicking out at an opponent, in a 3–1 loss to Rochdale.

Zorya Luhansk
Faupala announced on 6 November 2017 via an Instagram post that he had left Manchester City. On 6 February 2018 he signed 2+1 year contract with Ukrainian Premier League club Zorya Luhansk. He made his debut on 18 February 2018, playing 90 minutes in Zorya's 2–0 victory against Karpaty Lviv.

On 10 September 2019, Faupala joined Norwegian First Division side Jerv.

Career statistics

References

External links

1997 births
Living people
People from Bully-les-Mines
Sportspeople from Pas-de-Calais
French footballers
Association football forwards
Eerste Divisie players
Ukrainian Premier League players
Cypriot First Division players
Norwegian First Division players
Maltese Premier League players
Championnat National 2 players
Manchester City F.C. players
RC Lens players
NAC Breda players
Chesterfield F.C. players
FC Zorya Luhansk players
Apollon Limassol FC players
FK Jerv players
Valletta F.C. players
France youth international footballers
French expatriate footballers
Expatriate footballers in Cyprus
Expatriate footballers in England
French expatriate sportspeople in England
Expatriate footballers in the Netherlands
French expatriate sportspeople in the Netherlands
Expatriate footballers in Ukraine
French expatriate sportspeople in Ukraine
French expatriate sportspeople in Cyprus
Expatriate footballers in Norway
French expatriate sportspeople in Norway
Expatriate footballers in Malta
French expatriate sportspeople in Malta
French people of Wallis and Futuna descent
Footballers from Hauts-de-France